Gallay is a surname. Notable people with the surname include:

Alan Gallay, American historian
Ana Gallay (born 1986), Argentine beach volleyball player
Bernard Gallay (born 1959), Franco-Swiss yachtsman and businessman
Claudie Gallay (born 1961), French author
Jacques-François Gallay (1795–1864), French horn player
Olivia Gallay Bertrand (born 1989), French skier